Rock & Roll Submarine is an album by alternative rock band Urge Overkill, released in 2011. It was their first album in sixteen years.

Critical reception
Spin wrote: "Calcifying their trademark lounge leer into a dead-eyed glare, singer-guitarists Nash Kato and Ed 'King' Roeser ply curdled Bad Company riffs and a seedy, confessional air, serving up shit cocktails to anyone foolish enough to swallow ’90s nostalgia." The A.V. Club wrote that the band "keeps the Nuge-style riffage on Rock & Roll Submarine rooted in the realities of basement-show grime, tamping down the old stadium-ruling ambitions with wanton sloppiness and purposefully duller hooks." The Washington Post wrote that if the album "displays less attitude than Urge’s ’90s work, that’s probably because [Eddie] Roeser has gradually supplanted the flashier [Nash] Kato as the principal songwriter." The New Yorker thought that the Urge Overkill of Rock & Roll Submarine "offers a more raw sound, but with tightly arranged and raspingly sung anthems."

Track listing
"Mason/Dixon"—2:58
"Rock & Roll Submarine"—4:01
"Effigy"—3:44
"Poison Flower"—2:32
"Little Vice"—3:14
"Thought Balloon"—4:13
"Quiet Person"—3:23
"She's My Ride"—3:33
"End of Story"—3:24
"The Valiant"—3:45
"Niteliner"—2:21
"Touched to a Cut"—2:09

References

Urge Overkill albums
2011 albums